"The Pacifist" is a science fiction short story by British writer Arthur C. Clarke, first published in 1956 in Fantastic Universe. It appears in his collection of "science fiction tall tales," Tales from the White Hart.

The story deals with a computer programmer's revenge on his unreasonable military boss by tinkering with software code in a way that makes his boss the laughingstock of the organization.

"The Pacifist" details the construction of a supercomputer within "a cavern in Kentucky" (Clarke may have been thinking of Mammoth Cave, then suspected (and later known) to be the world's longest known cave system). The purpose of the computer is military battle simulation, and the details of all known historical battles have been stored in the computer's data banks.

The computer's designer, nicknamed "Dr. Milquetoast" by the story-within-a-story's narrator, works under the harsh supervision of a military General. By way of revenge, Dr. Milquetoast programs the computer so that it will answer purely theoretical or mathematical questions put to it, but when asked to solve a military problem, responds by insulting the General using phrases industriously prepared by the programmer. Frustration mounts as the General realizes that because the computer is aware of every known historical military battle, it is capable of recognizing such scenarios even when couched in purely mathematical terms.

Analysis

The story presents a computer programmer as an "everyman," a downtrodden and unappreciated worker who has the last laugh on his tormentor. In 1956, computers were rare, and computer programmers were regarded as an engineering elite. Although the character of Dr. Milquetoast is depicted in a classic stereotypical fashion for his character's archetype, the frustration he feels, at the hands of the General, humanizes the character.

Published near the beginning of the Cold War, "The Pacifist" satirizes the military-industrial complex (although the term would not come into wide use for another five years.) The involvement of civilian scientists in military projects was familiar to the reading public, notably the involvement of J. Robert Oppenheimer's team of nuclear scientists in the Manhattan Project, under the military leadership of General Leslie Groves.

Legacy

The story's theme of a  military computer gone haywire has been used numerous times in written and filmed science fiction. Later examples include Dr. Strangelove (1964), Colossus: The Forbin Project (novel, 1966, film version, 1970), and WarGames (1983).

References

External links 
 

Short stories by Arthur C. Clarke
1956 short stories
Works originally published in Fantastic Universe
Kentucky in fiction
Tales from the White Hart